Central Cumberland was an electoral district of the Legislative Assembly in the Australian state of New South Wales from 1859 to 1894, in Cumberland County, which includes Sydney, although the then built-up areas were in other electorates. It elected two members simultaneously from 1859 to 1885, three members from 1885 to 1889 and four members from 1889 to 1894, with voters casting a vote for each vacancy. In 1894, multi-member electorates were abolished and replaced by single-member electorates.

Members for Central Cumberland

Election results

References

Former electoral districts of New South Wales
Constituencies established in 1859
Constituencies disestablished in 1894
1859 establishments in Australia
1894 disestablishments in Australia